Lords Lake is a natural lake in South Dakota, in the United States.

Lords Lake has the name of James Lord, an early settler.

See also
List of lakes in South Dakota

References

Lakes of South Dakota
Bodies of water of Brown County, South Dakota